is a Japanese footballer who plays as a midfielder for Tokyo Verdy in the J2 League.

Career 
As a third year elementary student, he moved to Adachi, Tokyo. After playing for Criaju FC in his early career he joined the youth of JEF United Chiba after being urged on by a friend's sister. He made his debut for the first team in the home win (2–1) against Mito HollyHock on 3 December 2011 by replacing Yuichi Kubo in the 79th minute.

Club statistics
Updated to 2 December 2018.

Reserves performance

Club Memberships
Youth History
Takayagi Football Club
Criaju Rockies
2006-2008 JEF United Chiba U-15 Narashino
2009-2011 JEF United Chiba U-18
2011 JEF United Chiba Division 2

Pro History
2012 JEF United Chiba
2014 J League U-22 Selection

References

External links

Profile at JEF United Chiba

1994 births
Living people
Association football people from Chiba Prefecture
Japanese footballers
J1 League players
J2 League players
J3 League players
JEF United Chiba players
J.League U-22 Selection players
Gamba Osaka players
Gamba Osaka U-23 players
Montedio Yamagata players
Tokyo Verdy players
Association football midfielders